Christopher Jullien (born 22 March 1993) is a French professional footballer who plays as a centre-back for  club Montpellier. He is a former France youth international, having represented his country at under-20 level.

Club career

Early career and Auxerre 
After failing to earn selection into the prestigious Clairefontaine academy, Jullien joined another local Parisian club, Torcy, the same club that produced France national team's Paul Pogba. He then left in 2006 for Auxerre. 

After a year spent playing with the club's reserve team, former coach Jean-Guy Wallemme started playing him during the 2012–13 campaign in the second division. He made his club debut on 24 August 2012, when Auxerre won 2–1 against Laval. Jullien scored his first professional goal a week later, in a League Cup match against Dijon.

SC Freiburg
Jullien signed his first professional contract with SC Freiburg on a free transfer, after Auxerre failed to do so in the summer of 2013. During his first season in Freiburg, although he only appeared for the second team, he played in the fourth tier, the Regionalliga.

Loan to Dijon
In late June 2015, Jullien was loaned to Dijon in Ligue 2.

Toulouse
On 1 July 2016, Jullien signed a four-year contract for Ligue 1 side Toulouse.

Celtic
On 28 June 2019, Jullien signed a four-year contract for Celtic. He signed for a fee rumored to be in the region of £7 million, which would make him Celtic's second most expensive signing (after fellow Frenchman Odsonne Édouard, who signed for £9 million the previous summer).

In the following game against Romanians CFR Cluj, Jullien was left on the bench as Celtic crashed out losing 4–3 on the night and 5–4 on aggregate in a Champions League Qualifying 3rd round 2nd leg tie. He scored his first goal for Celtic in a UEFA Europa League qualifying tie against AIK on 29 August 2019. He suffered a head injury in a game in September 2019.

Jullien won his first domestic trophy, scoring the only goal in a 1–0 victory over Rangers in the 2019 Scottish League Cup Final on 8 December at Hampden Park.

Montpellier
On 23 August 2022, Jullien signed with Ligue 1 side Montpellier on a three-year contract. Celtic received a transfer fee of €1 million.

International career
Jullien was a member of France U20 team that won France's first ever FIFA U-20 World Cup held in Turkey.

Career statistics

Honours 
Celtic
 Scottish Premiership: 2019–20
Scottish Cup: 2019–20
 Scottish League Cup: 2019–20

France U20
FIFA U-20 World Cup: 2013

References

External links
 Christopher Jullien profile at foot-national.com
 
 
 
 
 

1993 births
Living people
People from Lagny-sur-Marne
Footballers from Seine-et-Marne
French footballers
Black French sportspeople
Association football defenders
France youth international footballers
Bundesliga players
Ligue 1 players
Ligue 2 players
Scottish Professional Football League players
US Torcy players
AJ Auxerre players
SC Freiburg players
Dijon FCO players
Toulouse FC players
Celtic F.C. players
Montpellier HSC players
French expatriate footballers
French expatriate sportspeople in Germany
Expatriate footballers in Germany
French expatriate sportspeople in Scotland
Expatriate footballers in Scotland